Bletoppen is a mountain in Tinn, Telemark, Norway, and is the highest point in the mountain area Blefjell.

From the summit, there is a view of Jonsknuten and Skrimfjella in the southeast, Lifjell in the southwest, Gaustatoppen in the west, and Hardangervidda in the northwest.

The summit is most easily reached by following a marked trail from the parking lot at Nordstul, a 3 to 4 hour hike in the summer. Numerous shorter paths start at the road to Fosskard and go up the steep western side of Blefjell.

References

Tinn
Mountains of Vestfold og Telemark